The 2009–10 Columbus Blue Jackets season was the team's tenth season of play in the National Hockey League (NHL).

Regular season
On February 3, 2010, the Jackets fired head coach Ken Hitchcock and named Claude Noel as interim head coach.

Divisional standings

Conference standings

Schedule and results
 Green background indicates win (2 points).
 Red background indicates regulation loss (0 points).
 Silver background indicates overtime/shootout loss (1 point).

Pre-season

Regular season

Playoffs

The Blue Jackets were unable to qualify for the playoffs, despite qualifying the previous year.

Player statistics

Skaters
Note: GP = Games played; G = Goals; A = Assists; Pts = Points; +/− = Plus/minus; PIM = Penalty minutes

Goaltenders
Note: GP = Games played; TOI = Time on ice (minutes); W = Wins; L = Losses; OT = Overtime losses; GA = Goals against; GAA= Goals against average; SA= Shots against; SV= Saves; Sv% = Save percentage; SO= Shutouts

†Denotes player spent time with another team before joining Blue Jackets. Stats reflect time with the Blue Jackets only.
‡Traded mid-season
Italics denotes franchise record

Awards and records

Awards

Records

Milestones

Transactions 

The Blue Jackets have been involved in the following transactions during the 2009–10 season.

Trades

Free agents acquired

Free agents lost

Claimed via waivers

Lost via waivers

Lost via retirement

Player signings

Draft picks 

Columbus had six picks at the 2009 NHL Entry Draft in Montreal, Quebec.

See also 
 2009–10 NHL season

Farm teams 
The American Hockey League's Syracuse Crunch and the ECHL's Gwinnett Gladiators are the Blue Jackets' minor league affiliates for the 2009–10 season.

References

External links
2009–10 Columbus Blue Jackets season at ESPN
2009–10 Columbus Blue Jackets season at Hockey Reference

Columbus Blue Jackets seasons
Columbus Blue Jackets season, 2009-10
Colum
Blue
Blue